The Liberal Democratic Union of Armenia is a liberal political party in Armenia.

History
Following the 2003 Armenian parliamentary election, the party won 4.6% of the popular vote but failed to gain any seats in the National Assembly. The party has not directly participated in any subsequent Parliamentary elections since 2003. In May 2009, members held a party congress to discuss political issues in Armenia and future plans of the party.

In June 2018, the party released a statement supporting the recent Armenian Velvet Revolution and called for an end to corruption and economic monopolies in the country. The party called for new programs to be implemented which will strengthen the country. The party also announced that it would not participate in the 2018 Armenian parliamentary election, but wished the political parties participating in the election integrity and wisdom and urged them to act in an atmosphere of love and tolerance for the sake of solid state building and for the welfare of the people.

The party is currently managed by a Board of Directors.

See also

Liberalism in Armenia
Politics of Armenia
Programs of political parties in Armenia

References

External links
Official web site
Liberal-Democratic Union Intends To Run In Parliamentary Elections 2 
Liberal Democratic Union of Armenia on Facebook

1999 establishments in Armenia
Political parties established in 1999
Political parties in Armenia
Pro-European political parties in Armenia
Liberal parties in Armenia